The Baptist Convention of Namibia is a Baptist Christian denomination in Namibia. It is affiliated with the Baptist World Alliance. The headquarters is in Windhoek.

History
The Baptist Convention of Namibia has its origins in a South African mission of the Baptist Union of Southern Africa in 1961.  It is officially founded in 1984.  According to a denomination census released in 2020, it claimed 45 churches and 8,849 members.

References

Baptist denominations in Africa
Evangelicalism in Namibia